José Manuel Poox Peralta (born 17 March 2003) is a Mexican weightlifter. He is a three-time medalist at the Pan American Weightlifting Championships.

Career 
Poox is a native of Champotón Municipality, Campeche.

He won the bronze medal in the men's 55kg event at the 2019 Youth World Weightlifting Championships held in Las Vegas, United States. He won the bronze medal in his event at the 2020 Pan American Weightlifting Championships held in Santo Domingo, Dominican Republic and the 2021 Pan American Weightlifting Championships held in Guayaquil, Ecuador.

He won the silver medal in the men's 55kg event at the 2022 Junior World Weightlifting Championships held in Heraklion, Greece. A few months later, he won the silver medal in the men's 55kg event at the Pan American Weightlifting Championships held in Bogotá, Colombia.

Achievements

References

External links 
 

Living people
2003 births
Place of birth missing (living people)
Mexican male weightlifters
Pan American Weightlifting Championships medalists
21st-century Mexican people
Sportspeople from Campeche